Ewa Wiśnierska, née Cieślewicz (born 23 December 1971, Nysa, Poland), is a German paraglider, a member of the German national paragliding team, who won the Paragliding World Cup on several occasions. She is mostly known for having survived extreme cold, lightning and lack of oxygen during an ascent to almost  inside a cumulonimbus cloud.

Wiśnierska lives in Aschau im Chiemgau, Bavaria, where she teaches paragliding and runs a company which offers courses in personal development.

Accident
On 14 February 2007, in spite of weather reports heralding the presence of violent thunderstorms, Wiśnierska decided to try to fly in order to train for the 2007 paragliding world championship near Manilla, New South Wales, Australia. She was sucked into the ascending current of a cumulonimbus cloud, a cloud responsible for large and heavy rains, usually with hail inside and extremely low temperatures. The GPS variometer also tracked vertical speeds of up to +20 m/s.

In the same weather event, the Chinese paraglider He Zhongpin was killed by a lightning strike, at 42 years old.

Film
In 2010, ABC1 and France 5 made the documentary film Miracle in the Storm about her story. The film was nominated as Most Outstanding Factual Program for the Logie Awards of 2011 and won the category Best Cinematography in a Documentary at the 2010 Australian Film Institute Awards.

See also 
 Cumulonimbus and aviation

References

1971 births
People from Nysa, Poland
Living people
Paraglider pilots
German sportswomen
Polish emigrants to Germany